Jamshed Quarters is a residential neighborhood in the Karachi East district of Karachi, Pakistan. It is administered as part of Jamshed Town, which was disbanded in 2011 but later restored in early 2022.

Demography 
There are several ethnic groups in Jamshed Quarters including Muhajirs, Punjabis, Sindhis, Kashmiris, Seraikis, Pakhtuns, Balochis, Memons, Bohras, Khutchi, Ismailis and Christians. The former ethnic groups were Muslims, Hindus, Christians, Parsis and Jews.

Jamshed Quarters has a big Imam Bargah and the Masjid Jamia Binoria.

History 
Jamshed Quarters was developed by Jamshed Nusserwanjee Mehta in 1922 and was named after him. In the same year 1922, he was elected president of the Karachi Municipality, an office he occupied till October 1932. He was born in 1886 in Karachi and died on 8 August 1952.

References

External links 
 Karachi website archived

Neighbourhoods of Karachi
Jamshed Town